Margaret Rosemary Woodgate (born 1 September 1935) is a former Australian politician.

Woodgate was born in Brisbane. A member of the Labor Party, she served on Pine Rivers Shire Council from 1985 to 1988 and was a delegate to the Queensland Local Government Conference during that time. In 1989 she was elected to the Queensland Legislative Assembly as the member for Pine Rivers, moving to Kurwongbah in 1992. She was Temporary Chairman of Committees from 1990 to 1991 and in 1995 was appointed Minister for Family and Community Services. Following the Labor Government's resignation after losing its one-seat majority in 1996 she became Shadow Minister for Families, Community Care and Aboriginal and Islander Affairs, but she resigned from the ministry in 1996 and from parliament in 1997, triggering a by-election.

References

1935 births
Living people
Members of the Queensland Legislative Assembly
Politicians from Brisbane
Queensland local councillors
Australian Labor Party members of the Parliament of Queensland
Women members of the Queensland Legislative Assembly
Women local councillors in Australia